Vicente Engonga Maté (born 20 October 1965) is a Spanish retired professional footballer who played mainly as a central midfielder but occasionally as a sweeper.

He played for six clubs in his career, having his longest and most successful spell at Mallorca despite arriving there aged 32. In total, he appeared in 327 La Liga matches and scored eight goals over 11 seasons.

Engonga was a Spanish international for two years, and represented the team at Euro 2000.

Club career
Born in Barcelona, Catalonia of Equatorial Guinean descent, Engonga spent his childhood in the Cantabria region, where his father was a footballer. He started his senior career with local lower league side Gimnástica de Torrelavega, and then joined CF Sporting Mahonés.

In 1991, Engonga moved to Real Valladolid in La Liga. In his first year the club were relegated to the Segunda División and he left for RC Celta de Vigo, with whom he was a finalist in the 1994 Copa del Rey.

Engonga was bought by league powerhouse Valencia CF in summer 1994, spending three seasons at the Mestalla Stadium. After a shaky start, he made 35 appearances in 1996–97, although the Che finished tenth.

Subsequently, Engonga signed with RCD Mallorca under Héctor Cúper's supervision, along with five other former teammates including Iván Campo. He displayed his best football at the Balearic Islands side, helping them win the 1998 Supercopa de España after beating FC Barcelona 3–1 on aggregate. Also that year, they reached the final of the UEFA Cup Winners' Cup, losing 2–1 to S.S. Lazio.

During the 2000–01 campaign, Engonga scored twice in 31 league games as his team earned a third-place finish, qualifying for the UEFA Champions League for the first time. In their first match in the competition, he scored the only goal to defeat Arsenal at Son Moix, an 11th-minute penalty after Ashley Cole was sent off for fouling Albert Luque.

In 2002, Engonga's contract expired and he joined second-tier Real Oviedo where he played for six months before moving abroad in late January 2003, signing a six-month loan deal with English club Coventry City in the Football League Division One. At the end of the season the 37-year-old retired, going on to work with Mallorca in several coaching capacities.

International career
On 23 September 1998, aged nearly 33, Engonga made his debut with the Spain national team, playing the full 90 minutes in a 1–0 friendly win over Russia in Granada. He was the second-oldest player to debut for the country after Ferenc Puskás, who was 34 and had previously represented Hungary.

Engonga scored his only goal on 5 May 1999 in a friendly against Croatia, equalising an eventual 3–1 victory in Seville. He was picked for the UEFA Euro 2000 squad, making a late substitute appearance in a 2–1 group stage defeat of Slovenia at the Amsterdam Arena, which was the last of his 14 caps.

Engonga was the first Spanish-born black player to play for the national team. During his career, he also represented the unofficial Cantabria autonomous team.

In August 2008, Engonga was appointed manager of Equatorial Guinea.

International goals
Scores and results list Spain's goal tally first, score column indicates score after each Engonga goal.

Personal life
Engonga's younger brother, Óscar, was also a professional midfielder. He played most of his career in the lower leagues of Spain, but was at Valladolid at the same time as Vicente.

Engonga's nephew, Igor, was selected by Equatorial Guinea for the 2015 Africa Cup of Nations.

Honours
Celta
Copa del Rey runner-up: 1993–94

Valencia
Copa del Rey runner-up: 1994–95

Mallorca
Supercopa de España: 1998
Copa del Rey runner-up: 1997–98 
UEFA Cup Winners' Cup runner-up: 1998–99

References

External links

1965 births
Living people
Spanish sportspeople of Equatoguinean descent
Spanish footballers
Footballers from Barcelona
Footballers from Cantabria
Association football midfielders
La Liga players
Segunda División players
Segunda División B players
Tercera División players
Gimnástica de Torrelavega footballers
Real Valladolid players
RC Celta de Vigo players
Valencia CF players
RCD Mallorca players
Real Oviedo players
English Football League players
Coventry City F.C. players
Spain international footballers
UEFA Euro 2000 players
Spanish expatriate footballers
Expatriate footballers in England
Spanish expatriate sportspeople in England
Spanish football managers
Segunda División B managers
RCD Mallorca B managers
Equatorial Guinea national football team managers